Marica Gajić (27 April 1995, Bijeljina, Bosnia and Herzegovina) is a Bosnian basketball player. She is a member and current captain of the women's basketball team of Bosnia and Herzegovina. She plays for the French Ligue Féminine de Basketball club .

Career 
She started her career in Budućnost from Bijeljina, at the age of 15 she played a season in the jersey of ŽKK RMU Banovići from Banovići. After that she played for ŽKK Celje from Celje, then, in the Turkish Women's Basketball Super League for Girne Yakin Dogu and then Mersin and Hatay. Recently, she played for the Spanish Liga Femenina de Baloncesto club CB Avenida (full name: Perfumerías Avenida Baloncesto, formerly C.B. Halcón Viajes).
Currently, Gajić is a member of the French Ligue Féminine de Basketball club Flammes Carolo Basket.

References 

Bosnia and Herzegovina women's basketball players
People from Bijeljina
Serbs of Bosnia and Herzegovina
1995 births
Living people
Washington Mystics draft picks